Daniel Sperber (Hebrew: דניאל שפרבר) is a British-born Israeli academic and centrist orthodox rabbi. He is a professor of Talmud at Bar-Ilan University in Israel, and an expert in classical philology, history of Jewish customs, Jewish art history, Jewish education, and Talmudic studies.

Biography

Daniel Sperber was born on 4 November 1940, in Gwrych Castle, Wales. He studied for rabbinical ordination at Yeshivat Kol Torah in Israel, earned a doctorate from University College, London, in the departments of Ancient History and Hebrew Studies.

He is married to Phyllis (Hannah) Magnus, a couples therapist, originally of Highland Park, Illinois. They have ten children. One of their daughters, Abigail, is the founder of Bat Kol, an Israeli Jewish religious lesbian group.

Academic and rabbinical career
He is the Milan Roven professor of Talmud at Bar-Ilan University in Israel, where he is also the President of the Ludwig and Erica Jesselson Institute for Advanced Torah Studies. He also served as rabbi of Menachem Zion Synagogue in the Old City of Jerusalem. In 2010, Sperber accepted an appointment as honorary Chancellor of the non-denominational Canadian Yeshiva & Rabbinical School in Toronto.

Sperber is the author of Minhagei Yisrael: Origins and History on the character and evolution of Jewish customs. He has written extensively on many issues regarding how Jewish law can evolve, and has evolved. This includes a call for a greater inclusion of women in certain ritual services, including ordination.

He is also a critic of how certain halachic rules have become too strict in recent years. Regarding kitniyot, he has said, "The attitude in the last few decades has changed and become stricter, to the point of absurdity", pointing out that non-kitniyot items have been added to the list, including "cottonseed oil, sunflower oil, peanut oil, and even hemp".

Sperber explains his rationale for allowing a greater role for women in Orthodox practice: "The first is that in the same way it is forbidden to permit that which is forbidden, it's also forbidden to forbid that which is permitted. The second is that it is not forbidden to permit that which is permitted, even if it wasn't practiced in the past, because halakha is dynamic, and when cultural circumstances change, one has to face up to these changes and accommodate them. The third principle is that if you can find a position of leniency, you should do so. So, when things are permitted, they should be encouraged."

He has received some criticism for not explaining the source of his personal authority to dislodge the views of prior voices in Jewish law, such as the Shulchan Aruch and the view of Maimonides, both of which are universally accepted in orthodox circles as the strongest, most authoritative halachic works.

Awards

In 1992, Sperber won the Israel Prize, for Jewish studies.

Published work
Material Culture in Eretz Israel during the Talmudic Period, Vol. 1, Bar-Ilan University Press, 1993.
Minhagei Yisrael: Origins and History. Mossad Harav Kook, 1998–2007, 8 vol..
Masekhet Derekh erets zuṭa u-Fereḳ ha-shalom (3rd Edition) [in Hebrew], 1994. 
Magic and Folklore in Rabbinic Literature, Bar-Ilan University Press, 1994. 
 Great is Peace, Jerusalem, 1979. 
Roman Palestine 200-400: Money and Prices, Bar-Ilan University Press, 1974; second edition with supplement 1991 . 
 

Nautica Talmudica, Bar-Ilan University Press and E.J. Brill, 1986. 
A Commentary on Derech Eretz Zuta Chapters 5-8, Bar-Ilan University Press, 1990. 
 
 Essays on Greek and Latin in the Mishna, Talmud and midrashic 1982
 
 
 
 Nautica in Talmudic Palestine. Mediterranean History Review, vol. 15, 2001
 Paralysis in Contemporary Halakhah? Tradition 36:3 (Fall 2002), 1-13.
 Tarbut Homrit Be'eretz Yisrael Beyemai Hatalmud (Material Culture in Eretz-Israel during the Talmudic Period), Vol. 2, Yad Yitzhak Ben Zvi & Bar Ilan University
 The Path of Halacha, Women Reading the Torah: A Case of Pesika Policy, Rubin Mass, Jerusalem, 2007 (Hebrew)
 
 
The Jewish Life Cycle: Custom, Lore and Iconography—Jewish Customs from the Cradle to the Grave (Oxford UP and Bar-Ilan UP, Aug. 2008)
 Why Jews Do What They Do: The History of Jewish Customs Throughout the Cycle of the Jewish Year by Daniel Sperber and Yaakov Elman, (KTAV, Jan 1999).
 Women and Men in Communal Prayer: Halakhic Perspectives by Rabbi Professor Daniel Sperber, Rabbi Mendel Shapiro, Professor Eliav Shochetman and Rabbi Dr. Shlomo Riskin, (KTAV, 10 Mar 2010).
Greek in Talmudic Palestine, Bar-Ilan University Press, 2012.
Contributor to the Talmud El Am on Kiddushin.
The Paths of Daniel: Studies in Judaism and Jewish Culture in Honor of Rabbi Professor Daniel Sperber Edited By: Adam S. Ferziger, Bar-Ilan University Press, 2017.

See also 
 List of Israel Prize recipients

References

External links
 Erica and Ludwig Jesselson Institute for Advanced Torah Studies
 Sherman Lectures, University of Manchester, 2004
 Sperber, D., "Congregational Dignity and Human Dignity: Women and Public Torah Reading" (pdf) Edah 3:2, 2002
 Bar-Ilan University Talmud Department
 Sperber, D. "'Friendly' Pesaq and the 'Friendly' Poseq" (pdf) Edah 5:2, 2006
 Daniel Sperber speaker information, Edah

1940 births
Living people
20th-century Israeli rabbis
21st-century Israeli rabbis
Alumni of University College London
Academic staff of Bar-Ilan University
British emigrants to Israel
British Orthodox rabbis
Israeli art historians
Israeli Modern Orthodox rabbis
Israel Prize in Jewish studies recipients
Israel Prize Rabbi recipients
Jewish historians
Judaism and women
Open Orthodox Jews
Academic staff of the Open University of Israel
Talmudists